This is a list of the 300 members who were elected to the Hellenic Parliament in the June 2012 Greek legislative election.

Composition

Members of Parliament 
Changes table below records all changes in party affiliation.

Changes 
 23 July 2012: Artemios Matthaiopoulos replaces Nikitas Siois (Golden Dawn) who resigned on 23 July.
 3 August 2012: Nikos Nikolopoulos is expelled from New Democracy (ND) and later founds the Christian Democratic Party.
 21 October 2012:  is expelled from New Democracy.
 22 October 2012: Ioannis Michelogiannakis (DIMAR) declares himself an independent.
 25 October 2012: Ioannis Michelogiannakis announces his collaboration with SYRIZA.
 8 November 2012: Mimis Androulakis (PASOK) declares himself an independent.
 12 November 2012: Theodoros Soldatos is expelled from the New Democracy group.
 3 December 2012: Andreas Loverdos is expelled from PASOK after founding RIKSSY.
 7 January 2013: Odysseas Voudouris and Paris Moutsinas are expelled from DIMAR.
 10 January 2013:  (PASOK) declares himself an independent.
 20 February 2013: Kostas Skandalidis, Angela Gerekou, Giannis Koutsoukos and Michalis Kassis return to the PASOK group.
 21 March 2013: Nikolaos Stavrogiannis and Ioannis Kourakos form Nea MERA.
 28 March 2013: Zetta Makri replaces Athanasios Nakos who died on 28 March (New Democracy).
 15 April 2013: Andreas Loverdos and Christos Aidonis form the Agreement for the New Greece.
 1 July 2013: Theodoros Soldatos and Kostas Markopoulos return to New Democracy (the latter had been an ND minister and MP before joining ANEL).
 4 July 2013: Ioannis Michelogiannakis joins the SYRIZA group.
 11 November 2013: Theodora Tzakri is expelled from the PASOK group for supporting a motion of no confidence submitted by SYRIZA.
 21 November 2013: 11 independent MPs of differing political views and party origins—Theodoros Parastatidis, Andreas Loverdos, Christos Aidonis, Mimis Androulakis, Markos Bolaris (former PASOK), Odysseas Voudouris, Paris Moutsinas (former DIMAR), Nikos Nikolopoulos, Georgios Kasapidis, Nikos Stavrogiannis (former ND) and Ioannis Kourakos (former ANEL)—decide to form a new parliamentary group, in order to enjoy the full benefits provided by the standing orders to groups of 10 or more MPs. The members of the new group, which takes the name Independent Democratic MPs, agree to make use of those benefits on a rotational basis. Theodoros Parastatidis is named the group's first rotating chairman.
 11 December 2013: Georgios Anagnostopoulos replaces Pavlos Sioufas (ND, Karditsa), who resigned on the same day.
 21 December 2013: Vyron Polydoras (ND), a former Speaker, declares himself an independent. He later founds the Union for the Homeland and the People.
 10 January 2014:  (SYRIZA) declares himself an independent.
 13 January 2014: Georgios Davris is expelled from the Independent Greeks group.
 23 January 2014: Georgios Davris joins the Independent Democratic MPs.
 27 January 2014: Petros Tatsopoulos joins the Independent Democratic MPs.
 15 March 2014: Chrysovalantis Alexopoulos (Golden Dawn) declares himself an independent.
 18 March 2014: Jailed MP Efstathios Boukouras is expelled from Golden Dawn. The same day, Rena Dourou (Syriza) resigns from Parliament in order to focus on her campaign for the presidency of Attica region. She is replaced by the next on the Athens B list, former Olympic swimmer Eleni Avlonitou.
 27 March 2014: Aris Spiliotopoulos (Athens B, ND) resigns from Parliament to focus on his campaign for the presidency of Attica region. Next on the list, Yannis Papathanasiou however declines after becoming Chairman of Hellenic Petroleum the month before.  (Tania) therefore takes Spiliotopoulos's seat.
 31 March 2014: Former Athens mayor, Nikitas Kaklamanis, is expelled from the New Democracy group.
 3 April 2014: Theodora Tzakri joins the Independent Democratic MPs.
 2 May 2014: six MPs resign before standing for the European Parliament election on 25 May:  & Manolis Kefalogiannis (ND), Sofia Sakorafa, Dimitris Papadimoulis & Manolis Glezos (Syriza) and Notis Marias (ANEL). They are replaced on 5 May by, respectively: Stamatis Karmantzis & Giorgos Diktakis  (ND), Fotini Kouvela,  & Mania Papadimitriou (Syriza) and Constantine Damavolitis (ANEL).
 9 May 2014: Chrysoula Giatagana and Konstantinos Giovanopoulos join the Independent Democratic MPs.
 29 May 2014: Vasilis Kapernaros (ANEL) declares himself an independent.
 3 June 2014:  (ANEL) declares herself an independent.
 6 June 2014:  (DIMAR) declares himself an independent.
 19 June 2014: Vasilis Kapernaros joins the Independent Democratic MPs.
 10 July 2014: Katerina Markou (DIMAR) declares herself an independent, and Grigoris Psarianos is expelled from the DIMAR group.
 22 August 2014: Andreas Loverdos returns to the PASOK group.
 27 August 2014: Nikos Stavrogiannis submits his resignation after being elected mayor of Lamia in the May election. His seat is taken over by New Democracy's Dimitris Brianis.
 29 August 2014: Stamatis Karmantzis (ND) resigns to take the position of Vice-President of the North Aegean region for Chios. His seat is taken by Maria Stavrinoudi-Soudi.
 9 September 2014 Spyros Lykoudis (DIMAR) declares himself an independent.
 7 October 2014: Nikos Nikolopoulos joins, and Rachil Makri is expelled from, the Independent Greeks group.
 9 October 2014: Nikitas Kaklamanis returns to the New Democracy group.
 16 October 2014: Rachil Makri and Mika Iatridi join the Independent Democratic MPs.
 3 November 2014: Dimitris Avramopoulos (ND) resigns as Minister for Defence and member of parliament after taking on the Migration, Home Affairs and Citizenship portfolio in the new Juncker Commission. His seat is taken over by Thanos Plevris.
 14 November 2014:  (ND) resigns. His seat is taken by Alexandros Moraitakis.
 1 December 2014: Panagiotis Melas (ANEL) declares himself an independent.
 3 December 2014: Panagiotis Melas joins the Independent Democratic MPs.
 23 December 2014: Niki Founta (DIMAR) declares herself an independent.

Notes and references

Sources 
Hellenic Parliament website

2012 06
2012 in Greek politics
2013 in Greek politics
2014 in Greek politics